The 1969 Primera División season was the 78th season of top-flight football in Argentina. The entire season (Metropolitano and Nacional championship) ran from 21 February to 22 December. Club Deportivo Morón and Unión de Santa Fe were promoted from Primera B Metropolitana via "Torneo de Reclasificación".

The Metropolitano was won by Chacarita Juniors (1st title in Primera División) while Boca Juniors won the Nacional (17th league title). 

Unlike previous editions, in 1969 there was only one team relegated, Deportivo Morón.

Campeonato Metropolitano

Group A

Group B

Semifinals

Notes

Final

Match details

Petit Tournament

Matches 
 Newell's Old Boys 1–0 Rosario Central
 Gimnasia y Esgrima LP 0-3 Unión (SF)
 Unión (SF) 4–3 Newell's Old Boys

Reclasificatorio "A" Tournament
Teams placed 9th to 11th in each zone of Metropolitano championship, plus 3 teams eliminated from Petit tournament, contested the "Torneo Reclasificatorio". Out of those 9 clubs, teams placed 1st to 7th would remain in Primera División while the last two teams plus two first of Primera B Metropolitana "Campeonato Zone" would play a new Reclasificatorio to determine which would be promoted or relegated.

Los Andes won the Reclasificatorio A, with no official title awarded.

Reclasificatorio de Primera Tournament
Contested by the two last teams of Torneo Reclasificación plus two teams from Primera B

Top scorers

Campeonato Nacional

Final standings

2nd place playoffs
After River Plate and San Lorenzo finished equaled on points, they played a two-legged series in neutral venues to determine which team would be the second qualified for 1970 Copa Libertadores:

Top scorers

References

Argentine Primera División seasons
p
Argentine Primera Division
1969 in Argentine football